Khin Zarchi Kyaw  (born 15 June 1976) is a Myanmar Academy Award winning Burmese actress and singer. She won the Myanmar Academy Award for Best Actress in 2002 with the film . Throughout her career, she has acted in over 550 films and only released one album.

Early life
Khin Zarchi Kyaw was born on 15 June 1976  in Yangon, Myanmar but grew up in Mandalay. She is the eldest child of Kyaw Kyaw and his wife San San Swe. She has an younger brother. Her family moved to Yangon from Mandalay when she was 15 years old.

Career
Khin Zarchi Kyaw started her acting career in 1991. She made her acting debut with a leading role in the film Khayar Tar Tar, alongside Nay Aung and Ye Aung, directed by Khin Zaw (Kaythipan). She then starred in her second film Phyu Ni Nyo Pyar, where she played a main role with Min Oo, Chit Chit Zaw and Lin Zarni Zaw.  The film was both a domestic hit, and led to increased recognition for Khin Zarchi Kyaw. In 1992, she took on her first big-screen role in the film Chit Pan Thi Tae Main Kalay, alongside May Sweet, Yan Aung and Yan Kyaw which screened in Myanmar cinemas in 1993. In 1999, she released a solo album "Shin Ma Pya Naing Buu".

In 1994, she starred in the big-screen film Naw Yin Mhwe, which earned her a nomination for the 1994 Myanmar Academy Award for Best Supporting Actress. She won the Best Actress in the 2002 Myanmar Academy Award for her performance in the film Me, Another, Men, Women. Ever since then she had starred in over 50 big screen films and over 500 films. 

In 2018, she starred in the film The Attachment, was screened in Myanmar cinemas on 8 June 2018 which earned her a nomination for the 2019 Myanmar Academy Award for Best Supporting Actress.

Filmography

Film 
Over 500 films, including
Khayar Tar Tar (ခရာတာတာ) (1990)
Phyu Ni Nyo Pyar (ဖြူနီညိုပြာ) (1990)

Film (Cinema)
Over 50 films, including
 Chit Pan Thi Tae Main Kalay (ချစ်ပန်းသီတဲ့မိန်းကလေး) (1993)
 Naw Yin Mhwe (နော်ရင်မွှေး) (1994)
 Me, Another, Men, Women (ငါ သူတစ်ပါး ယောက်ျား မိန်းမ) (2002) 
 Yazawin Yine Khae The (ရာဇဝင်ရိုင်းခဲ့သည်) (2018) 
 Ta Khu Latt (တခုလတ်) (2018)
The Attachment (ဥပါဒါန်) (2018)
 Myet Nu (2020)

Discography

Album
Shin Ma Pya Naing Buu (1999)

Awards and nominations

Personal life
Khin Zarchi Kyaw married in 2000 and they divorced in 2009. She have a son named Phone Min Nay La, a model and a daughter named Htin Thit Sar, a model.

References

1976 births
Living people
Burmese film actresses
21st-century Burmese actresses
People from Yangon